Coiled-coil domain containing 88B is a protein that in humans is encoded by the CCDC88B gene.

Function

This gene encodes a member of the hook-related protein family. Members of this family are characterized by an N-terminal potential microtubule binding domain, a central coiled-coiled and a C-terminal Hook-related domain. The encoded protein may be involved in linking organelles to microtubules. [provided by RefSeq, Oct 2009].

References

Further reading